Moretonhampstead railway station was the terminus of the Moretonhampstead and South Devon Railway at Moretonhampstead, Devon, England.

The station opened on 4 July 1866. It was situated on the south side of the town by the road to Bovey Tracey. The platform was 300 feet long and mostly covered by a wooden train shed. Beyond the train shed was a short platform with cattle pens.

South of the station was a goods shed and engine shed. The signal box was unusually built onto the side of the engine shed.
In 1929 the Great Western Railway, which now owned the line, opened the Manor House Hotel just outside Moretonhampstead.

After the last passenger train ran on 28 February 1959, regular goods trains continued until 6 April 1964, although British Railways continued to use the station as a base for its road goods services until the end of the year. The goods and engine sheds for many years continued to be used by a commercial road haulage business.

References

Notes

Sources

Disused railway stations in Devon
Former Great Western Railway stations
Railway stations in Great Britain opened in 1866
Railway stations in Great Britain closed in 1959
1866 establishments in England
railway station